Hvalbakur (meaning 'whale back') is a small island off the coast of Iceland, and the country's easternmost point. It is located in the Austurland region,  from the mainland. The island appears on maps from 1761 but may have been sighted much earlier.

References

Islands of Iceland